Hyrcanana is a genus of butterflies in the family Lycaenidae.

Lycaeninae
Lycaenidae genera